Kvatch may be:
 an alternative spelling of kvetch
 the name of a fictional location in the 2006 video game The Elder Scrolls IV: Oblivion

See also 
 Dmitry Kvach
 Kavach (disambiguation)